Alamar (To the Sea) is a 2009 Spanish-language documentary-style film about a boy visiting his father on the Banco Chinchorro. It is by Pedro González-Rubio. Alamar won best picture and the audience award at the 7th Morelia International Film Festival.

Content of the film
The film is set in the coral reef of Banco Chinchorro, listed as a "biosphere reserve" by UNESCO on February 2, 2004. Nathan, a 5-year-old urban boy, finds his father Jorge, a Mexican fisherman, during the holidays. They go fishing together; a bond between the father and his son is renewed, driven by the beauty of nature.

Between fiction and documentary, it is an initiatory experience for the small child and contemplative for the viewer.

Cast 
 Jorge Machado Jorge
 Natan Machado Palombini Natan
 Roberta Palombini Roberta
 Nestor Marin Matraca

Accolades

References

External links
 

2009 films
2000s Spanish-language films
Mexican docudrama films
2000s Mexican films